Unley Park is a southern suburb of Adelaide in the City of Unley. Its postcode is 5061.

It is located on the north side of Cross Road and east of the Belair railway line. Access via public transport is from the Unley Park railway station, Millswood railway station and the Unley Road "Go Zone".

A feature of the district is leafy Victoria Avenue—Adelaide's wealthiest street, containing many large and luxurious houses built between the two World Wars.

Politically, the suburb is safe for the Liberals; at the 2010 election, the Liberal Party attracted 62.33% of the primary vote at the nearby Hyde Park polling booth.

History
Unley Park Post Office opened on 2 January 1946 and closed in 1999.

Two historic private schools were located on Thornber Street, Unley Park: Kyre College (which was the nucleus of Scotch College) at number 4, and Mrs. Thornber's School, later associated with Tormore House School, at number 39. Both were dissolved early in the 20th Century.

See also
Heywood Park

References

Suburbs of Adelaide
Populated places established in 1840